Takhti Jam is a multi-purpose stadium, located in Jam, Iran. It is used mostly for football matches. The stadium is able to hold 15,000 people. Takhti Jam is the home stadium of Pars Jonoubi Jam. It is owned by the PSEEZ (Pars Special Energy Economic Zone).

References

Football venues in Iran